The 1997 Algarve Cup was the fourth edition of the Algarve Cup, an invitational women's association football tournament. It took place between 10  and 16 March 1997 in Portugal with Norway winning the event for the third time in its history, defeating the PR China, 1-0 in the final-game. Sweden ended up third defeating Denmark, 6-5 following a penalty shootout, in the third prize-game.

Format
The Netherlands returned to the tournament, replacing Russia.

The eight invited teams were split into two groups that played a round-robin tournament. On completion of this, the fourth placed teams in each group would play each other to determine seventh and eighth place, the third placed teams in each group would play each other to decide fifth and sixth place, the second placed teams in each group would play to determine third and fourth place and the winners of each group would compete for first and second place overall.

Points awarded in the group stage followed the standard formula of three points for a win, one point for a draw and zero points for a loss.

Group A

Group B

Seventh Place

Portugal finished bottom of their group for the fourth year in a row and lost the seventh place play-off on penalties to Iceland.

Fifth Place

Third Place

1996 runners up Sweden finished in third place overall after winning a penalty shootout following a goalless game.

Final

Norway won the competition for the third time thanks to Hege Riise's 75th-minute penalty.

Awards

References

External links
1997 Algarve Cup on RSSSF

1997
1997 in women's association football
1996–97 in Portuguese football
1997 in Norwegian women's football
1997 in Swedish women's football
1997 in Chinese football
1997 in Icelandic football
1996–97 in Danish women's football
1996–97 in Dutch football
1997 in Finnish football
March 1997 sports events in Europe
1997 in Portuguese women's sport